The 1943–44 season in Swedish football, starting August 1943 and ending July 1944:

Honours

Official titles

Competitions

Promotions, relegations and qualifications

Promotions

League transfers

Relegations

Domestic results

Allsvenskan 1943–44

Allsvenskan promotion play-off 1943–44

Division 2 Norra 1943–44

Division 2 Östra 1943–44

Division 2 Västra 1943–44

Division 2 Södra 1943–44

Division 2 promotion play-off 1943–44 
1st round

2nd round

Norrländska Mästerskapet 1944 
Final

Svenska Cupen 1943 
Final

National team results 

 Sweden: 

 Sweden: 

 Sweden:

National team players in season 1943/44

Notes

References 
Print

Online

 
Seasons in Swedish football